CHGS-FM is an emergency broadcast system radio station, owned by the municipality of Greenstone, Ontario. The station operates at 94.7 FM in the community of Geraldton.

The station was approved by the Canadian Radio-television and Telecommunications Commission on June 19, 2006.

References

External links
Municipality of Greenstone

Hgs
Radio stations established in 2006
2006 establishments in Ontario